Leonard Soccio (born May 28, 1967) is a Canadian-born German former professional ice hockey player. He is currently the head coach of EC Hannover Indians in Germany.

Playing career
Soccio was born in St. Catharines, Ontario. He played his junior hockey with the North Bay Centennials, an OHL team based out of North Bay, ON. In his four years with the Centennials, he scored 114 goals and 190 assists, totaling 304 points. In his final year, Soccio's 135 points was the second highest point total, trailing only Montreal Canadiens draft pick Andrew Cassels, chosen 17th overall in the NHL draft held earlier that year. Soccio would win the Leo Lalonde Memorial Trophy, which is given to the best overage player in the OHL.

Soccio started his professional hockey career in the IHL with the Fort Wayne Komets, where he played one game in the 1988-89 IHL season. The following year, he would play 60 games with the ECHL's Winston-Salem Thunderbirds, where he scored 51 goals and 113 points. He, along with teammate Trent Kaese and Bill McDougall of the Erie Panthers would be named the starting forwards of the East Coast Hockey League's all-star team.

After several teams in various minor leagues, Soccio signed with the Hannover Scorpions of the DEL. Soccio would lead the Scorpions in scoring five out his eight seasons, and would tie for the lead in another (teammate Gilbert Dionne had the same number of points but scored more goals). On March 7, 2006, Soccio's #20 was raised to the rafters in the form of an oversized jersey.

Coaching career

Following the end of his professional playing career, he opened the Soccio Ice and Event Center in Langenhagen near the city of Hannover.

Soccio would later return to the Scorpions as a player-coach and would later serve as a player-coach for SC Langenhagen, a 3rd division team, where he would score 11 goals and 41 points in the 2008-09 season.

In July 2011, Soccio joined the coaching staff of Germany's Women's National Team as an assistant.

In August 2013, Soccio took over as head coach of the Hannover Scorpions who had withdrawn from Germany's top-tier DEL and made a fresh start in the Oberliga. In May 2016, he was named head coach of fellow Oberliga team ECC Preussen Berlin.

Awards
1987-88: Leo Lalonde Memorial Trophy
1989-90: ECHL All Star
2001-02: DEL All-Star
2003-03: DEL All-Star

Career statistics

Regular season and playoffs

International

References

External links

1967 births
Brantford Smoke players
Columbus Chill players
Fort Wayne Komets players
German ice hockey centres
Greensboro Monarchs players
Hannover Scorpions players
Living people
Olympic ice hockey players of Germany
Ice hockey players at the 2002 Winter Olympics
Ice hockey people from Ontario
North Bay Centennials players
Sportspeople from St. Catharines
Springfield Indians players
St. Thomas Wildcats players
Winston-Salem Thunderbirds players
Buffalo Stampede players